Gulam Mehmood Banatwalla (15 August 1933 – 25 June 2008), also spelled as Banatwala, was an Indian politician and social worker from Mumbai. Banatwalla, a "firebrand orator" and intellectual, was regarded as the pan-India face of the Indian Muslim community.

Banatwalla was born in Bombay, in then-British India, to Haji Noor Mohamed and Ayesha in a Cutchi Memon family. He studied at Sydenham College of Commerce and Economics and S.T. College, Bombay. He married Ayesha in February 1960.

He was elected to the Maharashtra Legislative Assembly in 1967 (Umerkhadi, Bombay). He later served seven terms in the Loksabha, from Ponnani in Kerala, between 1977 – 1989 and 1996 – 2004. He also served as the national president of Indian Union Muslim League from 1993 to 2008. He was a member of the All India Muslim Personal Law Board.

Banatwalla never spoke Malayalam and addressed the people of Kerala in English. Banatwalla, aged 74, died on 25 June 2008. He had no children.

Books by G. M. Banatwala 

 Religion and Politics in India

 Muslim League

 Azadi Ke Bad (in Urdu)

Banatwala also contributed numerous articles in various journals both in English and Urdu.

References

1933 births
2008 deaths
Politicians from Mumbai
Maharashtra MLAs 1967–1972
People from Kutch district
India MPs 1977–1979
India MPs 1980–1984
India MPs 1984–1989
India MPs 1989–1991
India MPs 1996–1997
India MPs 1998–1999
India MPs 1999–2004
Indian Union Muslim League politicians
Lok Sabha members from Kerala